A provisional government, also called an interim government, an emergency government, or a transitional government, is an emergency governmental authority set up to manage a political transition generally in the cases of a newly formed state or following the collapse of the previous governing administration. Provisional governments are generally appointed, and frequently arise, either during or after civil or foreign wars.

Provisional governments maintain power until a new government can be appointed by a regular political process, which is generally an election. They may be involved with defining the legal structure of subsequent regimes, guidelines related to human rights and political freedoms, the structure of the economy, government institutions, and international alignment. Provisional governments differ from caretaker governments, which are responsible for governing within an established parliamentary system and serve as placeholders following a motion of no confidence,  or following the dissolution of the ruling coalition.

In opinion of Yossi Shain and Juan J. Linz, provisional governments can be classified to four groups:

 Revolutionary provisional governments (when the former regime is overthrown and the power belongs to the people who have overthrown it).
 Power sharing provisional governments (when the power is shared between former regime and the ones who are trying to change it).
 Incumbent provisional governments (when the power during transitional period belongs to the former regime).
 International provisional governments (when the power during the transitional period belongs to the international community).

The establishment of provisional governments is frequently tied to the implementation of transitional justice. Decisions related to transitional justice can determine who is allowed to participate in a provisional government.

The early provisional governments were created to prepare for the return of royal rule. Irregularly convened assemblies during the English Revolution, such as Confederate Ireland (1641–49), were described as "provisional". The Continental Congress, a convention of delegates from 13 British colonies on the east coast of North America became the provisional government of the United States in 1776, during the American Revolutionary War. The government shed its provisional status in 1781, following ratification of the Articles of Confederation, and continued in existence as the Congress of the Confederation until it was supplanted by the United States Congress in 1789.

The practice of using "provisional government" as part of a formal name can be traced to Talleyrand's government in France in 1814. In 1843, American pioneers in the Oregon Country, in the Pacific Northwest region of North America established the Provisional Government of Oregon—as the U.S. federal government had not yet extended its jurisdiction over the region—which existed until March 1849. The numerous provisional governments during the Revolutions of 1848 gave the word its modern meaning: A liberal government established to prepare for elections.

List of provisional governments 

Numerous provisional governments have been established since the 1850s.

Africa 
As of 2023 in Africa, only Libya, Sudan, Burkina Faso, and Chad currently have provisional governments.
  Provisional Government of the Algerian Republic (1958–62) (guerrilla movement)
  Transitional Government of National Unity (Namibia) (1985-1989), interim government during the end of the South African Border War
  Transitional Government of Ethiopia (1991–1995), established after the end of the Ethiopian Civil War
  Provisional Government of Eritrea (1993), established after independence from Ethiopia
  Transitional Government of the Democratic Republic of the Congo (2003-2006), established in 2003 following the conclusion of the Second Congo War
  National Transitional Legislative Assembly of Liberia (2003–2006), Liberia's legislative body during the country's transition from civil war to democratic rule
  National Transitional Council of Libya (2011-2012), formed during the 2011 civil war in Libya against the Gaddafi-led government
  Interim government of Egypt (2013–2014), established following the June 2013 Egyptian protests and subsequent coup
  The UN-supported Government of National Unity In Libya (2021–present), formed following the Libyan Political Dialogue Forum in Sirte
  Sovereignty Council of Sudan (2019–2021), established in August 2019 after 8 month-long protests against President Bashir and a subsequent military coup
  Transitional Military Council in Chad (2021–present), formed in April 2021 after the killing of President Idriss Déby during the Northern Chad offensive
  Patriotic Movement for Safeguard and Restoration in Burkina Faso (2022-present),formed on the 24 of January 2022 the group took over after a coup in January. The leader Paul-Henri Sandaogo Damiba suffered a coup himself. After that, Ibrahim Traroé took power as the leader of the group and interim president of Burkina Faso.

Americas 
  Venezuelan transitional government (2019–2022), established in January 2019 by the National Assembly led by Juan Guaidó, currently in dispute with the incumbent government of the Bolivarian Republic of Venezuela led by Nicolás Maduro. The transitional government is supported and recognized by United States, European Union, Lima Group, and many other Western countries
  National Council of Government (1986–1988), interim ruling body of Haiti, after the departure of Jean-Claude Duvalier

Asia 
  Revolutionary Government of the Philippines (1898–1899), established in the Spanish East Indies
  Provisional Government of the Republic of China (1912), established after the success of the Wuchang uprising.

World War I and Interbellum 
 Provisional Government of India (1915), established in Kabul.
 Republic of Van (1915), established in Western Armenia.
  South West Caucasian Republic (1919), established in Kars.
  Provisional Government of the Republic of Korea (1919), established in exile based in Shanghai, China and later in Chongqing, during the Japanese occupation of Korea.
  Government of the Grand National Assembly (1920-1923), established as an alternative government to the Allied-occupied Ottoman Empire during the Turkish War of Independence

World War II 
  Provisional Government of the Republic of China (1937–40), established by the Empire of Japan when invading Eastern China.
  Provisional Government of Free India (1943–1945), commonly known as Azad Hind, established by Indian nationalists in southeast Asia, had nominal sovereignty over Axis controlled Indian territories, and had diplomatic relationships with eleven countries including Germany, Italy, Japan, Philippines, and the Soviet Union. It was headed by Netaji Subhas Chandra Bose, who was the Head of the State and Prime Minister, who was also the Supreme Commander of the Indian National Army. The government had its own cabinet and banks. It was also the first government to recruit women for combat roles.

Cold War and aftermath 
  Interim Government of India (1946–1947), an interim government formed by the newly created Constituent Assembly of India to administer what would become the Dominion of India and the Dominion of Pakistan in the transitional period between British rule and independence.
  Emergency Government of the Republic of Indonesia (1948–1949), an emergency government established by Sjafruddin Prawiranegara in Sumatra following the capture of Yogyakarta, the then-Indonesian capital, by the Netherlands.
  Provisional government of Israel (1948–1949), established after Israel's declaration of independence and in place until after the first Knesset elections.
  Provisional Central Government of Vietnam (1948-1949), established as a puppet government by French during the First Indochina War.
  Provisional Government of the Syrian Arab Republic (1949), established by national consensus to draft a new constitution and reintroduce civilian rule after a series of military governments.
  Provisional Revolutionary Government of the Republic of South Vietnam (1969–1976), established during the Vietnam War against the United States and Republic of Vietnam
  Provisional Government of the People's Republic of Bangladesh (1970–1972), established after the declaration of freedom of Bengalis exiled to Calcutta.
  Interim Government of Iran, a provisional government established after the 1979 Iranian Revolution
  Democratic Republic of Iran, formed in 1981 by the People's Mujahedin of Iran based in Paris and later Albania. It serves as the main Iranian government-in-exile opposing the clerical government.
  Provisional Government of the Philippines (1986–1987), established after the People Power Revolution until the new constitution ratified
  Executive Committee of the Palestine Liberation Organization (1988–), after it was entrusted with the powers and responsibilities of the Provisional Government of the State of Palestine.
  United Nations Transitional Authority in Cambodia (1992–1993)
  Palestinian National Authority (1994–2013), the administrative organization, established to govern parts of the West Bank and Gaza Strip, following the Oslo Accords.

21st century 
 in Asia, Afghanistan, Myanmar, Syria, and Yemen currently have provisional governments. The Syrian provisional governments are opposition groups in rebellion against their internationally-recognized government. Afghanistan's provisional government is unrecognized, but is  the country's sole governing body. Myanmar and Yemen have both ruling and opposition provisional governments.
  Coalition Provisional Authority in Iraq (2003–2004) with the Iraqi Interim Governing Council, established to act as a caretaker administration in Iraq following the 2003 invasion of Iraq pending the hand over of power to the Iraqi people and the creation of a democratically elected civilian government.
  Iraqi Interim Government (2004–2005) and the Iraqi Transitional Government (2005–2006) were both provisional authorities established after the hand over of power to the Iraqi people following the 2003 invasion of Iraq to govern pending the adoption of a permanent constitution.
  Syrian Interim Government (2013–present), established by the Syrian National Coalition during the Syrian Civil War
  Supreme Political Council of Yemen (2015–present), established by the Houthi Movement after the 2014–15 Yemeni coup d'état, currently participating in the Yemeni Civil War (2014–present) against the governments of Abdrabbuh Mansur Hadi and the Presidential Leadership Council
  Southern Transitional Council of South Yemen (2016–present), established by the Southern Movement - a separatist group in southern Yemen - during the Yemeni Civil War (2014–present)
  Syrian Salvation Government (2017–present), established by Hayat Tahrir al-Sham in the Idlib Governorate
  Interim government of Kyrgyzstan (2020–2021), established in 2020 in the aftermath of the 2020 Kyrgyzstani protests
  National Unity Government of Myanmar (2021–present), established in exile by the Committee Representing Pyidaungsu Hluttaw in opposition to the 2021 Myanmar coup d'état
  Provisional Government of Myanmar (2021–present), established by the State Administration Council as a formalization of its rule six months after the 2021 Myanmar coup d'état
  Caretaker Cabinet of the Islamic Emirate of Afghanistan (2021–present), established by the Taliban following the 2021 fall of Kabul
  Presidential Leadership Council (2022–present), established by internationally-recognized outgoing president Abdrabbuh Mansur Hadi to seek a "comprehensive political solution" to the Yemeni Civil War

Europe 
  Provisional Government of Spain (1868–1871), established after the Spanish Glorious Revolution pending the election of a new Constitutional Monarch.

World War I and Interbellum 
  Provisional Government of Albania (1912–14), established after the First Balkan War
  Provisional Government of Western Thrace (1913), established in modern Greece in opposition to annexation by Bulgaria during the Second Balkan War.
  Provisional Government of Northern Epirus (1914), established against annexation to Albania.
  Provisional Government of the Irish Republic (1916), a title adopted by the leadership of the short-lived Easter Rising.
  Provisional Government of National Defence (northern Greece), 1916
  Russian Provisional Government (1917), established as a result of the February Revolution which led to the abdication of Tsar Nicholas II.
  State of Slovenes, Croats and Serbs, established in 1918 as the unrecognized first incarnation of Yugoslavia and later merged with the Kingdoms of Serbia and Montenegro to form the Kingdom of Serbs, Croats, and Slovenes.
  Estonian Provisional Government (1918–1919).
  Latvian Provisional Government (1918–1920).
  Ukrainian Provisional Government (1918).
  Provisional Government of the Northern Region (1918-1920).
  Provisional Government of Ireland (1922), established by the Anglo-Irish Treaty between the British government and Irish revolutionaries, in order to pave the way for the establishment of the Irish Free State in the same year.

World War II 
  Provisional Government of Lithuania (1941), established when Lithuanians overthrew the Soviet occupation during the June Uprising. It functioned briefly until Nazi Germany annexed the country.
  Provisional National Government of Hungary (1944–1945) (Ideiglenes Nemzeti Kormány).
  Provisional Government of the Democratic Federal Yugoslavia (1945).
  French Committee of National Liberation (Comité Français de Libération Nationale, CFLN) (1943–44), set up in Algiers, then a part of metropolitan France.
  Provisional Government of the French Republic (GPRF) (1944–46), government of the provisional Republic until the establishment of the Fourth Republic.
  Democratic Government of Albania (1944–46).
  Flensburg Government (1945), established following the suicides of Adolf Hitler and Joseph Goebbels during the closing days of the Third Reich.

Provisional governments were also established throughout Europe as occupied nations were liberated from Nazi occupation by the Allies.

Cold War 
  Provisional Cypriot Turkish Administration (1967-1971)

Collapse of the USSR and aftermath 
  Government of National Understanding, established in Czechoslovakia after the Velvet Revolution of 1989.
  National Salvation Front, established in Romania after the fall of Nicolae Ceaușescu and the end of the Socialist Republic of Romania in 1989.
  Estonian Interim Government (1990–1992)
  State Committee on the State of Emergency in the Soviet Union after the 1991 Soviet coup d'état attempt.

21st century 
As of 2021 in Europe, Belarus is the only country currently with a provisional government, established by the opposition in parallel with the government of the Republic of Belarus.
  Belarusian Coordination Council (2020–present), established in the aftermath of the 2020 Belarusian presidential election and during subsequent protests. The transitional government is supported and recognized by Lithuania.

Oceania 
  Provisional Government of Hawaii (1893-1894), established in 1893 after the overthrow of the Kingdom of Hawaii and renamed to the Republic of Hawaii in  1894.
  1901 caretaker government of Australia, established pending the first election to the newly established Commonwealth of Australia.

See also

 Caretaker government
 Government in exile
 Military junta
 Interregnum
 Martial law
 List of territories governed by the United Nations

References

Government